Sam Brown House (or Samuel Brown House) is a historic house in Gervais, Oregon, United States built in 1857 by Oregon pioneer and state senator Samuel Brown (1821-1886). The house is located on the French Prairie on the Peter Depot land claim and is believed to be the first in Oregon to be designed by an architect.

The house was featured in the August 1986 issue of National Geographic Magazine, which described Samuel Brown as a Missourian who dug 62 pounds of gold in California and later moved with his wife to Oregon.

It served as a stage stop and housed three generations of the Browns.  The son of the original Samuel Brown, Sam H. Brown, was a state senator and unsuccessfully ran for governor in 1934 and 1938.

The house was added to the National Register of Historic Places in 1974.

See also

 List of Registered Historic Places in Marion County, Oregon

References

External links
 Sam Brown House image, from the Oregon State Library
 1934 image of Sam Brown House, from the Library of Congress
Save Sam Brown House
 Renewed hope for saving historic Sam Brown House near Gervais

Gervais, Oregon
National Register of Historic Places in Marion County, Oregon
Neoclassical architecture in Oregon
Houses completed in 1857
Houses on the National Register of Historic Places in Oregon
Houses in Marion County, Oregon
1857 establishments in Oregon Territory